James Edward Hayter (born 9 April 1979) is an English footballer who plays as a forward; he last played for Weymouth FC. He holds the record for the fastest Football League hat-trick ever and has been on the winning side in three Football League play-off finals.

Club career

AFC Bournemouth
After progressing through the youth system with the south coast club AFC Bournemouth, Hayter made his official début for them in the 1996–97 season in a 3–1 Division Two defeat to Peterborough United. Despite a promising start, he failed to gain a first-team place and moved to Salisbury City on loan.

His performances there earned him a recall to Bournemouth from manager Mel Machin, scoring the fourth goal in a 4–0 demolition of Stoke on his return, and in October 2000 he equaled the club record for the number of goals scored in a match when he scored 4 against Bury. He was soon established as one of the most consistent and sought-after strikers outside the Premier League, and the proudest moment of his Bournemouth career came in May 2003 when he helped them achieve victory over Lincoln City in the Division Three playoff final.

On 24 February 2004, he came on as an 84th-minute substitute while Bournemouth were 3–0 up at home to Wrexham and scored the fastest Football League hat-trick ever in 2 minutes and 21.88seconds, beating the record set by Jimmy Scarth of Gillingham in 1952. His parents were at the match but missed his hat-trick as they had to leave early to get the last ferry back to the Isle of Wight.

Hayter finished as Bournemouth's top scorer for the 2005–06 season, with 22 goals to his name, which proved vital in saving them from relegation. While struggling to score for Bournemouth in the 2006–07 season, he was a vital part of their first-team and scored twice against Oldham Athletic (3–2 win), the winner at Chesterfield (1–0) and one in the 5–0 win against Leyton Orient.

Doncaster Rovers
On 30 May 2007, Hayter signed for Doncaster Rovers for a club record transfer fee of £200,000.

His 47th-minute header in the 2008 League One play-off final, against Leeds United helped Doncaster Rovers gain promotion to the Championship.

After Rovers' promotion to the Championship, Hayter struggled to find the net at the start of the 2008/9 season, but Rovers continued to show faith in Hayter, until an injury kept him out until March 2009. He started to find the form on his return to the side, scoring his first goal of the season in narrow 2–1 defeat to Watford on 4 April 2009. He scored another 3 goals in the 2008/9 season against Ipswich Town, Plymouth Argyle, and Crystal Palace, taking his goal tally for the season to 4. He made a good start to the 2009/10 season as well, scoring on an opening day at Watford, and also grabbing goals in games against Cardiff, Sheffield United and Crystal Palace to take his tally for the season to 4 in early December. He ended the 2009/10 season with 9 goals – a very good achievement given that Hayter played the majority of the season in a deeper role in the team due to Rovers' success using Billy Sharp as a lone striker.

He renewed his contract with Rovers in the summer of 2010, signing on for another two years. Hayter started the 2010/11 season well, scoring a headed goal in Doncaster's opening day win against Preston North End at Deepdale. Most of Hayter's goals for Rovers in the 2010/11 season have been headers and he has proved himself to be one of the best headers of the ball outside the Premiership. His headed goal against Middlesbrough on 17 December was his 7th league goal of the season. In May 2012, Hayter was released by the club after the expiry of his contract.

Yeovil Town
On 28 June 2012, Hayter signed for League One side Yeovil Town on a two-year contract, taking the vacant number 9 shirt. He scored two of Yeovil's goals in a 3 – 1 away win over Brentford on 21 August. Two weeks later, he got a goal against his former club Doncaster Rovers in a 2 – 1 win for Yeovil. Hayter scored twice in Yeovil's 2–2 draw with Torquay United in the Football League Trophy, as well as netting in the penalty shootout to help the Glovers through to the next round. On 19 May 2013, Hayter won promotion via the play-offs for the third time in his career as Yeovil were promoted to the Championship for the first time in the club's history.

Hayter was released by Yeovil at the end of the 2014–15 season following their relegation to League Two.

Havant & Waterlooville
In June 2015, Hayter joined Conference South side Havant & Waterlooville.

In June 2018, having made 84 league appearances and scored 13 goals for Havant & Waterlooville, Hayter departed the club.

Weymouth loan

In November 2017, Hayter joined Weymouth on a short-term loan from Havant & Waterlooville, making his début as a half-time substitute in a 0–3 Southern League Premier Division defeat at Slough Town.

After a month, having made three appearances for Weymouth, Hayter returned to Havant & Waterlooville in December 2017, featuring as a late substitute in a goalless draw with Bognor Regis Town.

Career statistics

Honours

Club
AFC Bournemouth
Football League Third Division play-off final 2003, winner
Doncaster Rovers
Football League One play-off final 2008, winner
Yeovil Town
Football League One play-off final 2013, winner

Individual
 2004: Isle of Wight Footballer of the Year
AFC Bournemouth
Football League One Player of the Month: October 2004
Doncaster Rovers
Football League Championship Player of the Month: November 2010

References

External links
James Hayter player profile at doncasterroversfc.co.uk

1979 births
People from Sandown
Living people
Association football forwards
English footballers
AFC Bournemouth players
Salisbury City F.C. players
Doncaster Rovers F.C. players
Yeovil Town F.C. players
Havant & Waterlooville F.C. players
English Football League players